The red-crowned malimbe (Malimbus coronatus) is a species of bird in the family Ploceidae.
It is found in Cameroon, Central African Republic, Republic of the Congo, Democratic Republic of the Congo, Equatorial Guinea, and Gabon.

References

External links
 Red-crowned malimbe -  Species text in Weaver Watch.

red-crowned malimbe
Birds of Central Africa
red-crowned malimbe
Taxonomy articles created by Polbot